Margaret Cunnison (29 May 1914 – 4 January 2004) was a Scottish aviator and the first Scottish woman flying instructor. She was one of the first women to join the Air Transport Auxiliary.

Life
Margaret Cunnison was born in Haddington in 1914. Her family was originally from Blairgowrie, in Perthshire, but they were living in Milngavie. Her father, James Cunnison was a lecturer in political economy at the University of Glasgow. Cunnison went to Laurel Bank School.

In 1933 Cunnison entered a competition to win an "air scholarship" with the Evening News. She won lessons with the Scottish Flying Club. She got her A Licence in Scotland then traveled to Lympne, Kent, to get her B licence, and gained the second Scottish woman's commercial pilot's licence.

She was already an instructor before the war and worked as an instructor with the Strathtay Aero Club.

Air Transport Auxiliary 
Cunnison joined the Air Transport Auxiliary (ATA) with the other initial 7 women in 1940. Together with Joan Hughes, Mona Friedlander, Rosemary Rees, Marion Wilberforce, Margaret Fairweather, Gabrielle Patterson and Winifred Crossley Fair they were known as the First Eight, and appointed by the Commandant of the ATA's women's section, Pauline Gower. Cunnison was the leading instructor at Hatfield Aerodrome responsible for evaluating and training the new pilots. 

She signed off on the American women pilots at Luton. As a result of her role, Cunnison mostly flew light aircraft.

She left the ATA to get married in 1943 to Geoffrey Ebbage, an ophthalmic surgeon with the RAMC. They lived in London and had a son. Cunnison died in Haddington in 2004.

Legacy
A bus company in Hatfield named its eight buses after the "first eight" of the Tiger Moth pilots in the ATA, including Cunnison.

In 2008, four years after her death, the fifteen surviving women members of the ATA (and 100 surviving male pilots) were given a special award by the Prime Minister Gordon Brown.

References

External links 
 

1914 births
2004 deaths
Scottish aviators
Air Transport Auxiliary pilots
Women aviators
20th-century Scottish women